Frederick Douglass Memorial Park is a historic cemetery for African Americans in the Oakwood neighborhood of Staten Island, New York. It is named for abolitionist, orator, statesman, and author Frederick Douglass (1818–1895), although he is not buried there. It has burial sites for numerous prominent African Americans, including a pioneering journalist, athletes, musicians, performers, political leaders, and business people.

The original 53-acre cemetery was founded in 1935 by undertaker Rodney Dade, business consultant Benjamin Diamond, and lawyer Frederick Bunn, who previously built the adjoining Valhalla Burial Park. The Frederick Douglass Memorial Park was managed by African Americans and intended to provide an attractive option for African Americans excluded from segregated cemeteries and facing high burial costs in the vicinity of New York. The first burials at the cemetery were on Monday June 10, 1935.

In 1961, a bronze bas relief cenotaph monument to Frederick Douglass designed by Angus McDougall was added near the cemetery's entrance. It was reportedly the first monument in New York City honoring the civil rights leader. 

In May 2018, the historic red-brick pillars and wrought-iron fencing at the cemetery were removed and replaced with a "glossy placard", a move that brought a suit from the Friends of Frederick Douglass Memorial Park Inc. The cemetery had also been reduced to 17 acres by this time.
The suit was thrown out by the Civil Supreme Court Justice.

The memorial park opened with "perpetual care" for graves included in the burial price, but by 2018 many of the graves were in bad repair with some gravesites lost or unrecognizable.

Administration
Original administration (1935):
 president – Frederick A. Bunn
 board members – Kenneth Duncan, vice-president; Rodney Dade, secretary and treasurer; James Beckett; W. C. Brown; William P. Hayes; William M. Kelley; A. Clayton Powell Sr.; Clarence C. Wright
 general manager of sales – W. A. Tooks.

Board of Directors (2020): Lucille H. Herring, President; Duane C. Felton,  Vice President; Virginia Allen, Secretary; Pamela M. Marshall, Treasurer; Michael Taylor,  2nd Vice President; Brandon P. Stradford, 3rd Vice President. Assistant Manager (2020): Virginia Footman.

Notable people interred
 Mamie Smith, singer, dancer, pianist, and actress
 Elias "Country" Brown – Negro league baseball player
 Lillyn Brown, singer and entertainer
 Eleanor Bumpurs, elderly disabled woman shot to death by police in a confrontation during her eviction
 Nannie C. Burden (1891–1947) – singer and political candidate
 Floyd J. Calvin (1902–1939) – journalist and news service founder
 Tommy Ladnier, trumpeter
 Joseph E. Lymas (1883–1947) – violinist
 Wentworth Arthur Matthew (1892–1973)
 Jimmy Mordecai, tap dancer
 Tom Doyed Overton (1889–1944)
 C. Luckeyth Roberts, pianist and composer
 Sol White, professional baseball player, manager, and executive
 Rev. S. J. Worell
 Julia Pearl Hughes, businesswoman and women's club leader
 Rosa Henderson, singer and entertainer

Notes

References

Further reading
 "Frederick Douglass Memorial Park Fills Long-Felt Need" The New York Age, July 30, 1949
 "Monument Honors Ex-Slave Crusader" New York Times, May 29, 1961
 "Monument Dedicated In N.Y." New Journal and Guide (Norfolk, VA), June 10, 1961
 "A Place of Dignity Falls on Hard Times" New York Times, Oct 17 2008
 "Hard-pressed Staten Island cemetery counting on descendants" Staten Island Advance, May 14, 2009
 "A cemetery holding Black bodies is in disrepair" New York Amsterdam News, May 11, 2017
 "In Oakwood, a troubled final resting place searches for help" Staten Island Advance, Jun 20 2017

External links
 Frederick Douglass Memorial Park Inc.
 

African-American cemeteries in New York City
Cemeteries in Staten Island
1935 establishments in New York City